Dale Arlington Bisnauth (1936 – 4 April 2013) was a Guyanese politician, writer and member of the clergy. He was the Minister of Labour, Human Services, and Social Security in the Government of Guyana. Bisnauth served previously as the Guyanese Minister of Education.

Biography
Dale Arlington Bisnauth was born 1936 in Better Success, British Guyana. He studied at the Unity Theological College of the West Indies in Jamaica, and later graduated with a Ph.D. in history from the University of the West Indies.

Bisnauth's publications include A Short History of the Guyana Presbyterian Church (1979), History of Religions in the Caribbean (1989), and The Settlement of Indians In Guyana: 1890-1930 (2000).

Bisnauth suffered a heart attack and died while in the Caribbean Heart Institute hospital in Georgetown, Guyana on 4 April 2013. He was 76.

References

External links
Government of Guyana - Cabinet Members
Author profile at Peepal Tree press

1936 births
2013 deaths
Government ministers of Guyana
Guyanese Anglican priests
Guyanese politicians of Indian descent
Guyanese writers
University of the West Indies alumni